The individual jumping event at the 2010 Summer Youth Olympics in Singapore took place from August 22 to August 24 at the Singapore Turf Riding Club.  Riders completed two rounds of jumping where the rider with the fewest penalties would win.  A jump-off would be played should riders in medal positions be tied.

Medalists

Results

Round A

Round B

Bronze Medal Jump-Off

Gold Medal Jump-Off

References
 Round A Results
 Round B and Jump-Off Results

Equestrian at the 2010 Summer Youth Olympics
2010 in equestrian